Konečný (Czech and Slovak feminine: Konečná) is a surname of Czech and Slovak origin. It may refer to:
 Alena Konečná (born 1984), Czech cyclist
 Jakub Konečný (born 2002), Czech ice hockey player
 Jaroslav Konečný (1945–2017), Czech handball player
 Kateřina Konečná (born 1981), Czech politician
 Lukáš Konečný (born 1978), Czech boxer
 Martin Konečný (born 1984), Czech gymnast
 Michaela Konečná (born 1998), Czech handball player
 Roman Konečný (born 1983), Slovak footballer
 Tomáš Konečný (disambiguation), several persons
 Travis Konecny (born 1997), Canadian ice hockey player
 Vlastibor Konečný (born 1957), Czech cyclist
 Zdeněk Konečný (born 1936), Czech basketball player

See also
 
 
 Konieczny (Polish form)

Czech-language surnames